William Edgar Gossage (born October 15, 1958) is a retired racing promoter and currently an American public speaker. He was formerly president and general manager of Texas Motor Speedway. In June 2021, he stepped down from the position at TMS after 27 years of running the speedway. Gossage is known in the NASCAR community as a promoter who had tried numerous, out-of-the-box promotional stunts to promote tracks and companies.

Early life and education 
Gossage was born on October 15, 1958, in Nashville, Tennessee to H.L. and Lucille Gossage. Early in his life, Gossage had ambitions of becoming a player in the NFL. Playing as an end for Pioneer Christian Academy, midway through his high school career he would decide to switch his focus towards journalism. He would commit to Middle Tennessee State University (MTSU), where he would major in journalism. While at MTSU, Gossage would write articles for the university's student newspaper, Sidelines along with sports articles for local Tennessee newspaper The Tennessean.

Career

Early promotional career (1980-1994) 
Gossage began his career in April 1980 as director of public relations and assistant general manager with Nashville International Raceway. In the following year, the company moved Gossage to manage Bristol Motor Speedway in February.

In October 1983, Gossage joined the Miller Brewing Company as marketing communications supervisor, working for the company's racing public relations program. However, after being tired of constant traveling that the program made him do, he left the Miller Brewing Company and joined Charlotte Motor Speedway in March 1989 as the vice president of public relations.

Texas Motor Speedway (1995-2021) 
In 1994, Speedway Motorsports, Inc. owner, Bruton Smith decided to build a new track. He handed over the project to Gossage to help determine a market location and a suitable tract of land for the new venue. Texas Motor Speedway's track debuted on April 6, 1997, running the Interstate Batteries 500. In 2004, Gossage became the president at TMS.

With the city of Dallas, Texas proposing a bid to host the 2012 Summer Olympics, in 2000, Gossage would propose the integration of motorsports into the Olympic Games as a demonstration sport. Gossage would propose using Texas Motor Speedway as a racing venue, along with using the track for several other sports.

In 2007, rumors speculated that Gossage would replace the commissioner of the NHL, Gary Bettman. Both Gossage and the NHL would deny the claims, with Gossage saying that he was loyal to SMI and Texas Motor Speedway.

In 2014, Gossage, with the help of Japanese electronics company Panasonic built Big Hoss TV, which was certified by the Guinness Book of World Records as the largest HDTV in the world. 

In June 2021, Gossage stepped down as president and general manager of Texas Motor Speedway.

Public speaking (2021-) 
Following his retirement from Texas Motor Speedway, Gossage would focus solely on a public speaking career.

Other racing work 
Gossage has served on the board of directors for Speedway Children’s Charities from 1997 to 2021, a member of the NASCAR Hall of Fame Nominating Committee, board of professional advisors for the MTSU College of Media and Entertainment, and member of the NASCAR Hall of Fame Voting Panel.

He served as a member of the IndyCar Iconic Committee, which selected the Dallara DW-12; and serves on the Kyle Petty Charity Ride Across America board of directors.

Awards and recognitions 
 In 2015, Gossage received Advertising Innovation and Marketing Excellence Award from the Dallas-Fort Worth chapters of the American Marketing Association and the American Advertising Federation.

 In 2017, he received the 2017 Middle Tennessee State University Distinguished Alumnus Award.
 In 2018, Eldora Speedway infield tunnel, Love Tunnel, was renamed as Gossage Tunnel in reference to Eddie Gossage.

 Gossage was named to D Magazine (Dallas Magazine) list of the area's Top 500 business leaders from 2005 to 2021.

Personal life 
Gossage has two brothers, Jeff and Craig.

His first child, Jessica Amber, was born on December 18, 1980. His second child, Dustin, was born 10 months later.

In July of 2009, Gossage was diagnosed with cancer and began treatment in the spring of the same year. In September of that same year, Gossage announced that his cancer was in complete remission.

References

Living people
1958 births
American business executives
American public speakers